Prasit Padungchok (born October 13, 1982) is a Thai professional footballer who plays as a goalkeeper for Thai League 1 club BG Pathum United.

International career
he was named in head coach Milovan Rajevac's squad for Thailand to the Friendly in October 2017, but did not make an appearance.

Honours

Club
BEC Tero Sasana
 Thai League Cup (1): 2014

Muangthong United
 Thai League Cup (1): 2017
 Thailand Champions Cup (1): 2017
 Mekong Club Championship (1): 2017

BG Pathum United
 Thailand Champions Cup (1): 2022

References

External links

Living people
1982 births
Prasit Padungchok
Prasit Padungchok
Association football goalkeepers
Prasit Padungchok
Prasit Padungchok
Prasit Padungchok
Prasit Padungchok
Prasit Padungchok
Prasit Padungchok